Speleophria bivexilla is a species of copepod in the family Speleophriidae. It is endemic to Bermuda.

References

External links

Endemic fauna of Bermuda
Copepods
Freshwater crustaceans of North America
Taxonomy articles created by Polbot
Crustaceans described in 1986